Etehomo Creek is a stream in the U.S. state of Mississippi.

Etehomo Creek is a name most likely derived from the Choctaw language, but its original meaning is obscure. Variant names are "Eatahoma Creek", "Etahoma Creek", "Etchahoma Creek", "Etehoma Creek", and "Etihoma Creek".

References

Rivers of Mississippi
Rivers of Jasper County, Mississippi
Rivers of Jones County, Mississippi
Mississippi placenames of Native American origin